Augusta Township may refer to:

Canada 
 Augusta township, Ontario

United States 
 Augusta Township, Hancock County, Illinois
 Augusta Township, Butler County, Kansas
 Augusta Charter Township, Michigan
 Augusta Township, Lac qui Parle County, Minnesota
 Augusta Township, Carroll County, Ohio
 Augusta Township, Northumberland County, Pennsylvania

Township name disambiguation pages